Erastus Flavel Beadle (September 9, 1821 – December 18, 1894) was an American printer and pioneer in publishing pulp fiction.

Biography
Erastus was born in Otsego County, New York, United States, in 1821, and had a brother, Irwin Pedro Beadle (1826-1882), who assisted him in various business undertakings. They were the grandsons of Benjamin Beadle, a Revolutionary War soldier. After a hiatus in Michigan, the Beadle family moved to New York, and lived in Chautauqua County, New York. Erastus worked for a miller named Hayes, where he began his printing career when cutting wooden letters to label bags of grain. In 1838, he was apprenticed to H. & E. Phinney, a publishing firm in Cooperstown, New York. There he learned typesetting, stereotyping, binding, and engraving. He married Mary Ann Pennington (d.1889) in 1846, and in 1847 the couple moved to Buffalo, New York, where Erastus worked as a stereotyper. In 1849 Irwin went to Buffalo too, and found a job as a bookbinder.

The next year, in 1850, the Beadle brothers set up their own stereotype foundry. Their first publishing venture was the magazine "Youth's Casket", started in 1852. Irwin left the company in 1856 and went to the Nebraska Territory where he acted as a secretary for a company settling the town of Saratoga. The town was busted in the Panic of 1857, and Beadle returned to New York shortly thereafter.

Books for the millions
In 1860, after finally settling down in Brooklyn, Irwin came with an idea to publish, first, ten-cent booklets, and then, a series of paper-covered novels at the same price, which brought him recognition and commercial success. On June 7, 1860, the New-York Tribune advertised the first book in the dime novel series, Indian Wife of the White Hunter written by Ann S. Stephens by printing the following, "Books for the Millions! A dollar book for the dime. 128 pages complete, only Ten Cents!!! Beadle's dime novels No. 1 Maleska."

Many established as well as aspiring writers took part in the project geared towards the masses, including William Jared Hall, Frances Fuller Victor, John Neal, Mayne Reid, A. J. H. Duganne, Edward S. Ellis, William Reynolds Eyster, William W. Busteed, James L. Bowen, Mary A. Denison, Charles Dunning Clark, among others. Orville James Victor served for nearly thirty years as the series' editor. His wife Metta Victor was the editor from 1859 to 1861 for Erastus Beadle's monthly magazine The Home. For many years, using several pen names, she wrote novels published by Beadle & Adams.

Later life
Erastus became a millionaire and retired to his estate in Cooperstown, New York, in 1889, where he died on December 18, 1894.

Recognition

At first, dime novels were denounced as "pernicious and evil" by literary purists. At the beginning of the twentieth century, in July 1907, Charles M. Harvey, a critic, changed the prevailing attitudes after publishing in the Atlantic Monthly a reflective piece titled, The Dime Novel in American Life. He stated there,

In the middle of the same century, Erastus F. Beadle was posthumously recognized as a Dime Novel King. His papers are archived at the University of Delaware.

The Home

Beadle & Adams
In 1856 Robert Adams joined the Beadle brothers' company in Buffalo. In 1858 the company relocated to New York City. In 1866 Robert Adams died. His younger brothers William and David Adams in 1866 went into business with Irwin Beadle, who in 1868 made his final retirement from publishing. The firm's publishing offices were on William Street in Manhattan. In 1872 the name "Beadle & Adams" was used for the company run by Erastus Beadle with William and David Adams. After Erastus Beadle died in 1894, Williams Adams became the sole owner of Beadle & Adams. William Adams died in 1896. In 1897 the company Beadle & Adams ceased to exist, the executors of Williams Adams's estate sold the assets of Beadle & Adams to M. J. Ivers & Co., and the Ivers name replaced the Beadle name on the Dime Library and the other publications formerly belonging to Beadle & Adams. 

In the 1870s, the series "Lives of Great Americans" presented biographies of Ethan Allen, Daniel Boone, Kit Carson, Davy Crockett, Ulysses S. Grant, John Paul Jones, Gilbert du Motier, Marquis de Lafayette, Abraham Lincoln, Israel Putnam, Pontiac, Tecumseh, George Washington, and Anthony Wayne.

References

Further reading
 To Nebraska in 1857: A Diary of E. F. Beadle.
 California Joe, the Mysterious Plainsman: The Strange Adventures of an Unknown Man, whose real identity, like that of the "Man of the Iron Mask," is still unsolved.  
 Adventures of Buffalo Bill from Boyhood to Manhood. Deeds of Daring, Scenes of Thrilling, Peril, and Romantic Incidents In the Early Life of W. F. Cody, the Monarch of Bordermen.

External links

Nickels & Dimes (Northern Illinois digitized dime novel database)
Northern Illinois University Libraries' Beadle and Adams project
University of Delaware archive

American publishers (people)
1821 births
1894 deaths
People from Oswego County, New York
19th-century American businesspeople